David Hallack (born 22 January 1966) is a Zimbabwean born English cricketer.  Hallack is a right-handed batsman who bowls right-arm medium pace.  He was born at Bulawayo, Zimbabwe.

Hallack represented the Derbyshire Cricket Board in a single List A match against the Middlesex Cricket Board in the 1st round of the 2003 Cheltenham & Gloucester Trophy which was played in 2002.  During this match he scored 9 runs.

Hallack currently plays club cricket for Ockbrook and Borrowash Cricket Club in the Derbyshire Premier Cricket League.

References

External links
Dave Hallack at Cricinfo
Dave Hallack at CricketArchive

1966 births
Living people
Cricketers from Bulawayo
English people of Zimbabwean descent
English cricketers
Derbyshire Cricket Board cricketers